Lake Auburn is a lake and reservoir in Auburn, Maine. It is the water supply for the Lewiston-Auburn area. The lake is closed to most recreational activity, including ice fishing and swimming. In 2013, the Lake experienced several small algal blooms, though the fishing conditions and local water supply were not extensively harmed by the change in conditions. Some of Maine's most sought after fish species are found in the lake, including Salmon, Lake Trout, and Brook Trout. In recent years, Lake Auburn has also seen rising populations of warm water fish species such as Largemouth Bass and Chain Pickerel, which are now thriving in soft, shallow areas of the lake. The rise of warmwater fish in the lake may have an impact on native Coldwater fishes in the near future.

References

Auburn
Auburn, Maine
Lewiston, Maine
Auburn
Protected areas of Androscoggin County, Maine